The 88th running of the Milan–San Remo cycling classic was held on 22 March 1997 and won by German Erik Zabel.

Summary
Michele Bartoli had a small lead on the top of the Poggio, before being joined by a small group with Johan Museeuw, Andrea Ferrigato and Marco Pantani. Rolf Sørensen led the pursuers, who rejoined the grupetto on the descent. A group of 40 decided the race in a sprint, for the first time in 17 years. Alberto Elli led the sprint from afar, but was overtaken by German sprint star Erik Zabel. Several riders were involved in a spectacular final-sprint crash, including Laurent Jalabert, Johan Museeuw and Maximilian Sciandri. Zabel was the second German winner of the Primavera after Rudi Altig in 1968.

Results

References

1997
March 1997 sports events in Europe
1997 in road cycling
1997 in Italian sport
1997 UCI Road World Cup